Niu Jin ( 208–238) was a military general serving under the warlord Cao Cao during the late Eastern Han dynasty of China. He continued serving in the state of Cao Wei, founded by Cao Cao's successor Cao Pi, during the Three Kingdoms period of China.

Life
Niu Jin participated in the Battle of Jiangling of 208, during which he volunteered to lead 300 horsemen to attack the enemy, but was only saved by Cao Ren when he got surrounded.

Years later, he participated in the counter-attack against the invading Shu forces in 231 and scored a victory over Zhuge Liang's unit, and pursued him to Mount Qi. In 234, he soundly defeated the Shu general Ma Dai on the battlefield and killed thousands of enemies. In 238, he followed Sima Yi on his campaign against Gongsun Yuan and was promoted to General of the Rear (後將軍).

However, Niu Jin's accomplishments in his later years had only earned him the apprehension from the Simas, thus he was ordered to commit suicide by drinking poison. The exact reasons for his death as well as the year he died remain disputed. The Yuan Shi Juan states that the incident happened "after the Year of the Horse" and that Niu Jin was poisoned by drinking toxic wine. Other records state that it was because Niu Jin committed adultery with one of the Sima relatives and was assassinated with poison arrows "during the Year of the Cow". This account is somewhat supported by Wei's records as they state that an illegitimate child was born in the Sima family. A story from unknown origin also states that Niu Jin was killed since he was actually a distant relative of the former emperor; his death date and the accuracy of this statement are difficult to verify.

In Romance of the Three Kingdoms
In the 14th-century historical novel Romance of the Three Kingdoms, Niu Jin was one of Cao Ren's subordinates. He chased Gan Ning back to Yiling during the battle of Jiangling, but was surrounded by reinforcements led by Zhou Yu, and was ultimately defeated. Niu Jin then regrouped and planned a night attack on Zhou Yu's camp, but in the end he was once again beaten, suffering another great loss.

See also
 Lists of people of the Three Kingdoms

References

 Chen, Shou (3rd century). Records of the Three Kingdoms (Sanguozhi).
 Pei, Songzhi (5th century). Annotations to Records of the Three Kingdoms (Sanguozhi zhu).

Year of birth unknown
Year of death unknown
Generals under Cao Cao
Cao Wei generals
Chinese politicians who committed suicide
Suicides in Cao Wei